James Ernest Cartwright (11 December 1888 – 1955) was an English professional footballer who played as an outside left in the Football League for Manchester City and Crystal Palace.

Personal life 
Carney served as an ordinary seaman in the Royal Naval Volunteer Reserve during the First World War.

Career statistics

References

1888 births
1955 deaths
Sportspeople from Cheshire
English footballers
Association football outside forwards
Northwich Victoria F.C. players
Manchester City F.C. players
Leeds City F.C. wartime guest players
Crystal Palace F.C. players
Llanelli Town A.F.C. players
English Football League players
Royal Naval Volunteer Reserve personnel of World War I
Southern Football League players
Royal Navy sailors